is a Japanese astronomer. He is a prolific discoverer of asteroids.

List of discovered minor planets

References 
 

Living people
21st-century Japanese astronomers
Discoverers of asteroids

20th-century Japanese astronomers
Year of birth missing (living people)